Parliamentary elections were held in Yugoslavia between 16 March and 10 May 1974 through a complicated delegate system which selected delegates to local, republic, and federal assemblies.

Background
The elections were the first held under the new constitution adopted on 31 January 1974. It provided for a bicameral Assembly with a 220-member Federal Chamber and an 88-member Chamber of Republics and Provinces.

Electoral system
The members of the Federal Chamber represented three groups; self-managing organisations, communities and socio-political organisations. Thirty members were elected from each of the six republics and 20 from the two autonomous provinces, Kosovo and Vojvodina.

In late March, voters elected representatives of basic labour organisations. These in turn elected the Communal Assemblies in early April. The Communal Assemblies then elected the members of the Federal Chamber between 22 and 29 April.

The members of the Chamber of Republics were elected by the Assemblies of the six republics and provinces, with each republic electing 12 members and Kosovo and Vojvodina electing eight each. Members were elected in a period ending on 10 May.

Communal assemblies, April
Communal assemblies were elected by local delegates elected by self-managing organisations, communities and socio-political organisations in early April. They subsequently each elected a President of the Assembly equivalent to a mayor. There were a total of 501 such tricameral communal assemblies in the country. For some of the larger cities:

Republic and provincial assemblies convened, April
In April and May inaugural sessions of all three chambers of the republics' and provinces' assemblies convened for the first time and elected the presidents of all their bodies.

Republic Presidencies and Executive Councils, April

Council of Republics and Provinces elected by 10 May
By 10 May the assemblies of the republics and provinces elected members from each of their three constituent councils (Associated Labour, Socio-Political, and Municipal) to serve dual mandates within their republic or province and within the Federal Council of Republics and Provinces. Each republic sent 12 members to the council, while the two provinces sent 8 each.

Assembly convened, 15 May
On 15 May a joint session of both chambers of the Assembly convened for the first time and elected the presidents of all the bodies.

President and Presidency, 16 May
On 16 May a joint assembly of both chambers of the Assembly re-elected President of the League of Communists Josip Broz Tito as President of the Republic. Article 333 of the new constitution affirmed Tito's right to serve as president-for-life at the discretion of the Assembly.

The Assembly also confirmed the members of the collective Presidency selected by individual republic and provincial assemblies on 16 May.

Federal Executive Council elected, 17 May
On 17 May a new Federal Executive Council was elected with Džemal Bijedić serving as its President.

References

Yugoslavia
Elections in Yugoslavia
1974 in Yugoslavia
May 1974 events in Europe
One-party elections